Kingsley College is a ministry and theology school of the Wesleyan Methodist Church of Australia. The college headquarters are located in Melbourne, Victoria, Australia. The college was founded by Kingsley Ridgway in 1948 as the Wesleyan Methodist Bible College of Australia. Its students come from a variety of denominational and national backgrounds.

History 
In 1946, Kingsley Ridgway founded the Wesleyan Methodist Church of Australia in Victoria. His vision was to establish a training college that would equip students with the theology of practical holiness. Sponsored by the Wesleyan Methodist Church of America, a property was purchased in Glenroy, Victoria, to serve as the national headquarters and the training college. The Wesleyan Methodist Bible College began to offer training in 1949 with a class of seven students. By 1974, the three-year Diploma of Theology had expanded to a four-year Bachelor of Theology degree. 1974 also saw a change of name applied to the college; Kingsley College offered training under a name honouring the founder.
Prior to 2006, Kingsley College had offered self-accredited training. In 2006, Kingsley College became part of the Sydney College of Divinity (SCD), and in 2008 partnered with the higher education programs of Tabor College Victoria.

By 2006 Kingsley College was offering a three-year Bachelor of Arts degree in Christian ministry along with post-graduate study in Christian ministry. Also available was a program of study in Christian counselling at a certificate and graduate level. This year also marked the birth of Kingsley Community study, a vocational training in a Certificate IV in Christian Ministry and Theology. The foundational purpose of offering vocational training was to better equip men and women in local churches for ministry. An initial two training centres began in Brisbane, with centres added each year since. Student numbers continue to grow, along with the opportunities for students to pursue further vocational training. In 2010 the national leaders of the Wesleyan Methodist Church approved the Kingsley Community study as the avenue for ministerial training through to ordination.

Present

Kingsley College now solely offers awards within vocational training under the auspice of Unity College Australia RTO 6330.

Kingsley College exists to serve the whole Christian Church by providing practical accredited theological education and training. Kingsley College serves the church by developing and equipping people to carry out the mission in vocations in Christian ministry pastoral work, chaplaincy, Christian education, missions, or Christian counselling. Kingsley is committed to the spiritual formation of both lay-people and those in full-time Christian leadership. Their training is based on the spiritual development of individuals as they grow in God's grace and are transformed into the likeness of Christ.

Kingsley provides training for men and women in Christian ministry with training centres around Australia in strategic locations. Distance study or connection to a class via web conference is also available.

Kingsley Community study is a ministry of the Wesleyan Methodist Church of Australia and, therefore, has links to such colleges as the Nazarene Theological College and Booth College in Sydney.

Courses

Study in Christian Ministry and Theology is offered under the auspices of Unity College Australia RTO 6330.

Kingsley Community study offers the following vocational education programs:

10742NAT Certificate IV in Christian Ministry and Theology: In this program, students engage with the Bible and theological themes and explore the implications for Christian life and practice.

10743NAT Diploma of Christian Ministry and Theology: In this program, students analyse and interpret the Bible, beliefs and current theological thinking. At this level, students will be enabled to apply their learning to Christian leadership and ministry.

10744NAT Advanced Diploma of Christian Ministry and Theology: In the advanced diploma, students develop skills to interpret and synthesise information related to a range of Christian beliefs. At this level, students will provide advanced knowledge related to Christian beliefs and understandings to Christian and non-Christian audiences, and fulfill formal leadership with attending responsibilities, expectations and requirements within the Christian ministry sector.

10745NAT Graduate Certificate of Christian Ministry and Theology: In the graduate certificate, students develop the knowledge and skills to provide; specialised knowledge related to Christian beliefs, specialised guidance in a defined range of life and ministry situations based on interpretations about Christian beliefs, and broad leadership within the Christian ministry sector.

The outcome of each vocational course is to provide participants with a range of knowledge, skills and competencies that will enable them to serve effectively in churches, parishes, para-church organisations, missionary organisations and schools. Graduates from these courses may find employment as pastors, church workers, ministry leaders, chaplains, religious education instructors, missionary workers, church planters and mission support workers depending on the requirements of the organisation. Students can further their studies through an application into the degree program of a Bible college.

Mission statement

"Through the transforming power of the Gospel of Jesus Christ, we at Kingsley Australia facilitate the development and equipping of Christians to become empowered and passionate in their ministry to shape their world." This mission statement is used by other Methodist institutions, for example, Mary Valley Wesleyan Methodist Church.

Principals

References

External links

Eastern College Australia

 

Educational institutions established in 1948
Education in Melbourne
Seminaries and theological colleges in Australia
Methodist seminaries and theological colleges
1948 establishments in Australia